Hans-Gert Pöttering (born 15 September 1945) is a German lawyer, historian and conservative politician (CDU, European People's Party), who served as President of the European Parliament from January 2007 to July 2009 and as Chairman of the CDU-affiliated Konrad Adenauer Foundation from 2010 to 2017.

He served as a Member of the European Parliament continuously since the first elections in 1979 until 2014 and was Chairman of the European People's Party-European Democrats 1999–2007. When he stepped down in 2014 he was the European Parliament's longest-serving member. As president of the European Parliament he proposed the creation of the House of European History museum in Brussels.

Early life and education
Pöttering never got to know his father who was killed in action during the last days of the Second World War. After Abitur and military service, he studied law, political science and history at the University of Bonn, the University of Geneva, the Graduate Institute of International Studies in Geneva and at Columbia University in New York. He took his first state exam in jurisprudence in 1973, earned a PhD in political science and history in 1974 with a dissertation on West German defense policy in the 1950s and 1960s and took his second state exam in jurisprudence in 1976, fully qualifying as an attorney.

Political career

Member of the European Parliament, 1979–2014
Pöttering was a member of the European Parliament from 1979 until 2014, by the end of this period he was the only member of the European Parliament to have served continuously since the first elections.

From 1984 to 1994 Pöttering was chairman of the Subcommittee on Security and Defence. From 1994 to 1996 he chaired the working group on the Intergovernmental Conference of the European People's Party (EPP) and EPP-ED Group, the results of which became the official EPP position for the Treaty of Amsterdam.

In 1994 Pöttering became Vice-President of the EPP, and from 1999 to 2007 he was the Chairman of the EPP-ED Group in the European Parliament. He was the top candidate of the CDU in the 2004 and the 2009 European elections.

Together with Volker Hassemer he is a member of the advisory board of the pro-European initiative "A Soul for Europe". He was a member of the Reconciliation of European Histories Group.

President of the European Parliament, 2007–2009
As part of a deal with the socialist group, it was agreed that he would succeed Josep Borrell Fontelles as President of the European Parliament in the second part of the 2004–2009 term, which he did on 16 January 2007. He was elected with 450 of 689 valid votes, and defeated Italian Green Monica Frassoni, Danish Eurosceptic Jens-Peter Bonde and French Communist Francis Wurtz.

As President of the European Parliament he initiated the House of European History project. He made reference to the House in his inaugural speech in 2007.
For many years he is serving as the Chairman of the Board of Trustees of the House of European History in Brussels.

Later career
On 4 December 2009 Pöttering was elected Chairman of the Konrad Adenauer Foundation from 1 January 2010; he was succeeded by Norbert Lammert in 2018.

When the EPP membership of Hungarian party Fidesz was suspended in 2019, EPP president Joseph Daul appointed Pöttering – alongside Herman van Rompuy and Wolfgang Schüssel – to a group of high-level experts who were mandated to monitor Fidesz's compliance with EPP values.

Political positions
Pöttering is known as an enthusiastic European Federalist and an ally of Angela Merkel. He has stated that his priority will be to rejuvenate the European Constitution.

In February 2020, Pöttering joined around fifty former European prime ministers and foreign ministers in signing an open letter published by British newspaper The Guardian to condemn U.S. President Donald Trump's Middle East peace plan, saying it would create an apartheid-like situation in occupied Palestinian territory.

Recognition

National honours 
 : Great Cross with Star and Sash of the Order of Merit of the Federal Republic of Germany (2010)

Foreign honours 
 : Grand Golden Decoration of Honour for Services to the Republic of Austria (2002)
 : Grand Cross of the Papal Order of St Gregory the Great (2007)
 : Great Cross of Merit of the Grand Order of Queen Jelena with Star and Shoulder Ribbon (2007)
 : 1st Class of the Order of Merit of the Italian Republic (2008)
 :  2nd Class of the Order of Prince Jaroslaw the Wise (2008)
 : Grand Cross of the Order of the Three Stars (2009)
 : Grand Cross of the Order of Merit (Portugal) (2009)
 : Commander of the Legion of Honour (2011)
 : Grand Cross of the Order of Civil Merit of the Kingdom of Spain (2011)
 : Knight Commander's Cross of the Order of Merit of the Republic of Poland (2013)
 : Commander of the Order for Merits to Lithuania (2013)
 : Grand Cross of the Order of Merit of the Hungarian Republic (2013)
 : 1st Class of the Order of the Cross of Terra Mariana (2013)
 : Grand Cross of the Order of the Star of Romania (2014)
 : Grand Officer of the National Order of Merit of the Republic of Tunisia (2016)

Awards
 Robert Schuman Medal of EPP-ED (1995)
: Mérite Européen Medal in Gold, Fondation du Mérite européen (2002)
 European Honorary Senator, the 'MEP of the Year 2004' by newspaper ‘European Voice’ (2004)
Walter Hallstein Prize (2007)
 European Excellence Award of the Autonomous Community of Madrid ('Premio a la Excelencia Europea', 2008)
 Ben Gurion Medal of Ben Gurion University (2010)
 Polish-German Prize (2011)

Honorary degrees
 Doctor Honoris Causa of Babeş Bolyai University in Cluj-Napoca, Romania
 Doctor Honoris Causa of the University of Opole, Poland
 Doctor Honoris Causa of the University of Warmia and Mazury in Olsztyn, Poland
 Doctor Honoris Causa of the Miguel de Cervantes European University, Santiago de Chile
 Doctor Honoris Causa of Bahçeşehir University in Istanbul, Turkey
 Doctor Honoris Causa of the University of Wrocław, Poland
 Doctor Honoris Causa of Ateneo de Manila University, Philippines
 Honorary Professor at the Pontifical Catholic University of Argentina 
 Doctor Honoris Causa of the University of Korea, Seoul
 Doctor Honoris Causa of the European Humanities University, Vilnius
 Honorary citizen of Bersenbrueck (Germany) and Opole (Poland)

Other activities
 Friends of Europe, Member of the Board of Trustees
 Reimagine Europa, Member of the Advisory Board
 Wilfried Martens Centre for European Studies, Member of the Executive Board

Personal life
Pöttering lives in Bad Iburg, Germany. He is Roman Catholic, divorced and has two sons.

Works
Adenauers Sicherheitspolitik 1955–1963. Ein Beitrag zum deutsch-amerikanischen Verhältnis, Droste Verlag 1975, 
Europas Vereinigte Staaten, Editio Interfrom 2000, with Ludger Kühnhardt
Weltpartner Europäische Union, Edition Interfrom 2001, with Ludger Kühnhardt
Kontinent Europa. Kern, Übergänge, Grenzen, Edition Interfrom 2002, zusammen mit Ludger Kühnhardt
Von der Vision zur Wirklichkeit. Auf dem Weg zur Einigung Europas, Bouvier 2004,

References

External links

Biography  from the official EU Parliament web site
Official website
President Pöttering looks back at 30 years of European elections Last retrieved 24-11-08
. 

|-

1945 births
Living people
People from Osnabrück (district)
German Roman Catholics
Presidents of the European Parliament
Christian Democratic Union of Germany MEPs
MEPs for Germany 1979–1984
MEPs for Germany 1984–1989
MEPs for Germany 1989–1994
MEPs for Germany 1994–1999
MEPs for Germany 1999–2004
MEPs for Germany 2004–2009
MEPs for Germany 2009–2014
University of Bonn alumni
Columbia University alumni
Graduate Institute of International and Development Studies alumni
Grand Crosses with Star and Sash of the Order of Merit of the Federal Republic of Germany
German legal scholars
Recipients of the Order of the Cross of Terra Mariana, 1st Class
Recipients of the Order of Prince Yaroslav the Wise